Kolby Kenneth Allard (born August 13, 1997) is an American professional baseball pitcher for the Atlanta Braves of Major League Baseball (MLB). He previously played for the Braves and Texas Rangers. He was selected by the Braves with the 14th overall pick in the first round of the 2015 MLB draft.

Early life and amateur career
Kolby Allard was born in Anaheim, California on August 13, 1997, to parents Kenny and Kristi. He has a younger brother. Allard began playing baseball at the age of five, and focused on pitching at age ten.

Allard attended San Clemente High School in San Clemente, California. As a junior, he had a 1.32 earned run average (ERA) with 98 strikeouts in  innings pitched. After the season, he played in the Perfect Game All-American Classic, where he was named MVP after striking out the side in the inning he pitched. Later in the summer he played for the USA Baseball 18U National Team. Allard's senior season ended prematurely after he suffered a stress fracture in his back. Prior to the injury, Allard was projected to be a top 10 pick in the 2015 Major League Baseball Draft. He committed to play college baseball for the UCLA Bruins.

Professional career

Atlanta Braves
The Atlanta Braves selected Allard with the 14th pick in the first round of the 2015 Major League Baseball draft. His high school batterymate, Lucas Herbert, was also drafted by the Braves, 54th overall. Allard signed with the Braves on July 9 for $3 million. 

Allard began pitching for the Gulf Coast League Braves in August 2015. After three scoreless appearances, he was shut down for back surgery which was described as a "minor back procedure." The Braves sent Allard to extended spring training to start the 2016 season. Allard spent 2016 with both the Rome Braves and the Danville Braves. In 2017, he pitched for the Mississippi Braves. The next year Allard was invited to spring training and ultimately began the season with the Gwinnett Stripers. Allard pitched  innings for the Stripers, recording a 2.80 ERA, 87 strikeouts and 33 walks. He was promoted to the major leagues for the first time on July 30, 2018. Allard made his major league debut the next day, pitching five innings against the Miami Marlins, yielding four earned runs on five hits, as well as two walks and one strikeout. Age 20 at the time of his first appearance, Allard became the youngest left-handed pitcher since Charlie Vaughan in 1966 to record a win in his debut. Allard opened the 2019 season with Gwinnett, going 7–5 with a 4.17 ERA over 110 innings.

Texas Rangers
On July 30, 2019, Allard was traded to the Texas Rangers in exchange for Chris Martin. He was then optioned to the Triple-A Nashville Sounds. After one start for Nashville, Allard was promoted to the Rangers. In 9 starts for Texas, Allard went 4–2 with a 4.96 ERA and 33 strikeouts over  innings. He struggled greatly in 2020, when he went 0–6 with a 7.75 ERA over  innings. Allard posted a 3–12 record with a 5.41 ERA and 104 strikeouts over  innings in 2021 for Texas.

Atlanta Braves (second stint)
On November 9, 2022, Allard was traded to the Atlanta Braves in exchange for Jake Odorizzi and cash considerations.

References

External links

1997 births
Living people
People from San Clemente, California
Baseball players from Anaheim, California
Major League Baseball pitchers
Atlanta Braves players
Texas Rangers players
Gulf Coast Braves players
Rome Braves players
Danville Braves players
Mississippi Braves players
Gwinnett Stripers players
Nashville Sounds players
Round Rock Express players